Jaroensap Kiatbanchong; is a former professional Muay Thai practitioner, born 29 September 1971 in Thung Song, Nakhon Si Thammarat, Thailand. He won two Lumpinee Stadium titles during the golden era of Muay Thai and was elected Fighter of the Year in 1992.

After career
After retiring from competition Jaroensap opened a gym called Sit Jaroensap in Pathum Thani. He teaches to fighters competing in Bangkok such as Phetsongpark Sitjaroensap, Phtesongkom Sitjaroensap and his son Fourwin Sitjaroensap who won an IFMA Youth World title in 2017 and the True4U 108 lbs title in 2018.

Titles and accomplishments 
Lumpinee Stadium
 1991 Lumpinee Stadium 112 lbs Champion (one defense)
 1992 Lumpinee Stadium 115 lbs Champion (one defense)

Awards
 1992 Sport Writers Association of Thailand Fighter of the Year

Muay Thai record

|-  style="background:#cfc;"
| 2013-12- || Win ||align=left| Nungubon Sitlerchai || Lumpinee Stadium  || Bangkok, Thailand || Decision || 5 || 3:00
|-  style="background:#fbb;"
| 2013-05-10 || Loss ||align=left| Thailand Pinsinchai ||  Rajadamnern Stadium || Bangkok, Thailand || Decision || 5 || 3:00 
|-
! style=background:white colspan=9 |
|-  style="background:#cfc;"
| 2013-03-06 || Win||align=left| Nungubon Sitlerchai ||  Rajadamnern Stadium || Bangkok, Thailand || Decision || 5 || 3:00
|-  style="background:#cfc;"
| 2013-01-21 || Win ||align=left| Lakhin Wassandasit ||  || Nakhon Si Thammarat, Thailand || Decision || 5 || 3:00
|-  bgcolor="#fbb"
| 2006-02-26 || Loss ||align=left| Liam Harrison || Patong Stadium || Phuket, Thailand || TKO (Ref Stop) || 2 || 3:00
|- style="background:#;"
| 2001-04-25 || ||align=left| Chalamlek Sor.Utapaogym ||Rajadamnern Stadium || Bangkok, Thailand || ||  ||
|-  style="background:#cfc;"
| 2001-02-18 || Win ||align=left| Namphonlek Nongkeepahuyuth|| Samrong Stadium || Samut Prakan, Thailand || Decision || 5 || 3:00
|-  style="background:#cfc;"
| 2001-01-14 || Win ||align=left| Amnuaypon Bor.Kor.Sor|| Samrong Stadium || Samut Prakan, Thailand || Decision || 5 || 3:00
|-  style="background:#cfc;"
| 2000-09-03 || Win ||align=left| Kasemlek Sakthewan || || Bangkok, Thailand || ||  ||
|-  style="background:#cfc;"
| 2000-04-29 || Win ||align=left| Singthongnoi Sitsaengaroon || Lumpinee Stadium || Bangkok, Thailand || Decision || 5 || 3:00
|-  style="background:#cfc;"
| 2000-02-06 || Win ||align=left| Choengnoen BoonsongTransport || Samrong Stadium || Samut Prakan, Thailand || Decision || 5 || 3:00
|- style="background:#cfc;"
| 1999-11-19 || Win ||align=left| Bandonglek Bunthawee || Lumpinee Stadium || Bangkok, Thailand || Decision || 5 || 3:00
|- style="background:#cfc;"
| 1999-10-17 || Win ||align=left| Dewid Looksamrong ||  || Chachoengsao Province, Thailand || Decision || 5 || 3:00
|-  style="background:#fbb;"
| 1999-08-07 || Loss ||align=left|  Singthongnoi Sitsaengaroon || Lumpinee Stadium || Bangkok, Thailand || Decision || 5 || 3:00
|- style="background:#;"
| 1999-07-06 || ||align=left| Rungroj Por.Sawadee || || Thung Song, Thailand ||  ||  ||
|- style="background:#cfc;"
| 1995-09-16 || Win ||align=left| Bandonglek Bunthawee || Lumpinee Stadium || Bangkok, Thailand || Decision || 5 || 3:00
|- style="background:#fbb;"
| 1994-09-24 || Loss ||align=left| Boonthawon Singhuaikaew || Lumpinee Stadium || Bangkok, Thailand || TKO (Low kicks)|| 2 ||
|- style="background:#cfc;"
| 1994- || Win ||align=left| Singhaao Tor.Hintok  || || Bangkok, Thailand || ||  ||
|- style="background:#cfc;"
| 1994- || Win ||align=left| Sornsueknoi Sakwichan  || || Bangkok, Thailand || ||  ||
|- style="background:#fbb;"
| 1994-04-02 || Loss ||align=left| Saengmorakot Sor.Ploenchit || Lumpinee Stadium || Bangkok, Thailand || Decision || 5 || 3:00
|- style="background:#fbb;"
| 1994-01-28 || Loss||align=left| Khaoponglek Luksuratham || Lumpinee Stadium || Bangkok, Thailand || ||  ||
|- style="background:#cfc;"
| ? || Win ||align=left| Nungubon Sitlerchai  || Lumpinee Stadium || Bangkok, Thailand || ||  ||
|- style="background:#fbb;"
| 1993-12-24 || Loss||align=left| Samkor Chor.Ratchatasupak || Lumpinee Stadium || Bangkok, Thailand || Decision || 5 || 3:00
|- style="background:#fbb;"
| 1993-11-16 || Loss||align=left| Kruekchai Kaewsamrit || Lumpinee Stadium || Bangkok, Thailand || Decision || 5 || 3:00
|-  style="background:#fbb;"
| 1993-09-17 || Loss ||align=left| Hansuk Prasathinpanomrung  || Lumpinee Stadium ||  Bangkok, Thailand  || Decision || 5 || 3:00
|-  style="background:#fbb;"
| 1993-08-31 || Loss ||align=left| Wangchannoi Sor Palangchai  || Lumpinee Stadium ||  Bangkok, Thailand  || Decision || 5 || 3:00
|- style="background:#fbb;"
| 1993-07-09 || Loss ||align=left| Chatchai Paiseetong || Lumpinee Stadium ||  Bangkok, Thailand  || KO (Spinning back Elbow) || 5 ||
|- style="background:#cfc;"
| 1993-06-08 ||Win||align=left| Nungubon Sitlerchai || Lumpinee Stadium ||  Bangkok, Thailand  || Decision || 5 || 3:00
|- style="background:#fbb;"
| 1993-04-30 || Loss ||align=left| Lamnamoon Sor.Sumalee || Lumpinee Stadium ||  Bangkok, Thailand  || Decision || 5 || 3:00
|-
! style=background:white colspan=9 |
|-  style="background:#fbb;"
| 1993-04-06|| Loss ||align=left| Boonlai Sor.Thanikul || Lumpinee Stadium || Bangkok, Thailand || Decision || 5 || 3:00
|-  style="background:#cfc;"
| 1993-03-23 || Win ||align=left| Lakhin Wassandasit || Rajadamnern Stadium || Bangkok, Thailand || Decision  || 5 || 3:00
|-  style="background:#cfc;"
| 1993-02-05 ||Win ||align=left| Nungubon Sitlerchai || Lumpinee Stadium || Bangkok, Thailand || Decision || 5 || 3:00
|- style="background:#fbb"
| 1993-01-08 || Loss ||align=left| Kaensak Sor.Ploenjit || Lumpinee Stadium ||  Bangkok, Thailand  || Decision || 5 || 3:00
|- style="background:#cfc;"
| 1992-12-04 || Win ||align=left| Kaensak Sor.Ploenjit || Lumpinee Stadium ||  Bangkok, Thailand  ||Decision || 5 || 3:00
|-
! style=background:white colspan=9 |
|- style="background:#c5d2ea;"
| 1992-11-06 || Draw||align=left| Lamnamoon Sor.Sumalee || Lumpinee Stadium ||  Bangkok, Thailand  || Decision || 5 || 3:00
|- style="background:#cfc;"
| 1992- || Win ||align=left| Dokmaipa Por Pongsawang || Lumpinee Stadium ||  Bangkok, Thailand  ||Decision || 5 || 3:00
|- style="background:#cfc;"
| 1992-08-07 || Win ||align=left| Langsuan Panyuthaphum || Lumpinee Stadium ||  Bangkok, Thailand  || KO (Punches)|| 2 || 
|-
! style=background:white colspan=9 |
|- style="background:#cfc;"
| 1992-07-07 || Win ||align=left| Chainoi Muangsurin || Lumpinee Stadium ||  Bangkok, Thailand  ||Decision || 5 || 3:00
|- style="background:#cfc;"
| 1992-06-23 || Win ||align=left| Vicharn Sitchuchon || Lumpinee Stadium ||  Bangkok, Thailand  ||Decision || 5 || 3:00
|- style="background:#cfc;"
| 1992-05- || Win ||align=left| Pompetch Naratrkiul || Lumpinee Stadium ||  Bangkok, Thailand  ||Decision || 5 || 3:00

|- style="background:#fbb;"
| 1992-03-04 || Loss||align=left| Samingprai Sor.Rungnakorn  || Lumpinee Stadium ||  Bangkok, Thailand  || Decision || 5 || 3:00
|- style="background:#cfc;"
| 1992-02-21 || Win ||align=left| Moohok Tor.Hintok  || Lumpinee Stadium ||  Bangkok, Thailand  || Decision || 5 || 3:00
|- style="background:#fbb;"
| 1992-01-21 || Loss ||align=left| Tukatathong Por Pongsawang  || Lumpinee Stadium ||  Bangkok, Thailand  || Decision || 5 || 3:00
|- style="background:#cfc;"
| 1992- || Win ||align=left| Detduang Por Pongsawang  || Lumpinee Stadium ||  Bangkok, Thailand  || Decision || 5 || 3:00
|- style="background:#cfc;"
| 1992-12-05 || Win ||align=left| Pompetch Kiatchatpayak  || Lumpinee Stadium ||  Bangkok, Thailand  || Decision || 5 || 3:00
|- style="background:#fbb;"
| 1991-11-04 || Loss ||align=left| Karuhat Sor.Supawan || OneSongchai  ||  New Zealand  || Decision || 5 || 3:00 
|-
! style=background:white colspan=9 |
|- style="background:#fbb;"
| 1991-09-27 || Loss ||align=left| Panphet Muangsurin  || Lumpinee Stadium ||  Bangkok, Thailand  || TKO ||2 ||
|- style="background:#fbb;"
| 1991-09-03 || Loss ||align=left| Dokmaipa Por Pongsawang  || Lumpinee Stadium ||  Bangkok, Thailand  || Decision ||5 ||3:00
|- style="background:#fbb;"
| 1991-08-14 || Loss ||align=left| Tuktathong Por Pongsawang  || Rajadamnern Stadium ||  Bangkok, Thailand  || Decision ||5 ||3:00
|-  style="background:#cfc;"
| 1991-07-16 || Win ||align=left| Duangsompong Por Pongsawang || Lumpinee Stadium || Bangkok, Thailand || Decision  || 5 || 3:00
|- style="background:#fbb;"
| 1991-06-28 || Loss ||align=left| Nungubon Sitlerchai || Lumpinee Stadium ||  Bangkok, Thailand  || Decision ||5 ||3:00
|- style="background:#fbb;"
| 1991-05-31 || Loss ||align=left| Langsuan Panyuthaphum || Lumpinee Stadium ||  Bangkok, Thailand  || Decision || 5 || 3:00
|-
! style=background:white colspan=9 |
|- style="background:#fbb;"
| 1991-04-30 || Loss||align=left| Langsuan Panyuthaphum || Lumpinee Stadium ||  Bangkok, Thailand  || Decision || 5 || 3:00
|-  style="background:#cfc;"
| 1991-03-29 || Win ||align=left| Duangsompong Por Pongsawang || Lumpinee Stadium || Bangkok, Thailand || Decision  || 5 || 3:00
|-  style="background:#cfc;"
| 1991-02-23 || Win ||align=left| Pairojnoi Sor Siamchai || Lumpinee Stadium || Bangkok, Thailand || Decision  || 5 || 3:00 
|-
! style=background:white colspan=9 |

|-  style="background:#fbb;"
| 1991-01-21 || Loss||align=left| Mathee Jadeepitak || Rajadamnern Stadium || Bangkok, Thailand || Decision  || 5 || 3:00

|-  style="background:#cfc;"
| 1990-12-11 || Win ||align=left| Detduang Por Pongsawang ||Lumpinee Stadium  || Bangkok, Thailand || KO || 3 ||
|-  style="background:#cfc;"
| 1990-11-20 || Win ||align=left| Langsuan Panyuthaphum || Lumpinee Stadium || Bangkok, Thailand || Decision || 5 ||3:00
|-  style="background:#cfc;"
| 1990-10-07 || Win ||align=left| Chainoi Muangsurin ||  || New Zealand || Decision  || 5 || 3:00 
|-
! style=background:white colspan=9 |
|-  style="background:#cfc;"
| 1990-08-31 || Win ||align=left| Chainoi Muangsurin || Lumpinee Stadium || Bangkok, Thailand || Decision  || 5 || 3:00 
|-
! style=background:white colspan=9 |
|-  style="background:#cfc;"
| 1990-07-20 || Win ||align=left| Pongsiri Por Ruamrudee || Lumpinee Stadium || Bangkok, Thailand || Decision  || 5 || 3:00
|-  style="background:#cfc;"
| 1990-06-08 || Win ||align=left| Hippy Singmanee || Lumpinee Stadium || Bangkok, Thailand || KO || 2 ||
|- style="background:#fbb;"
| 1990-05-21 || Loss ||align=left| Kompayak Singmanee || Rajadamnern Stadium ||  Bangkok, Thailand  || Decision || 5 || 3:00
|-  style="background:#cfc;"
| 1990-05-04 || Win ||align=left| Duangsompong Por Pongsawang || Lumpinee Stadium || Bangkok, Thailand || Decision  || 5 || 3:00

|-  style="background:#cfc;"
| 1990-04-18 || Win ||align=left| Saengdaw Kiatanan || Rajadamnern Stadium || Bangkok, Thailand || Decision  || 5 || 3:00

|-  style="background:#cfc;"
| 1990-03-25 || Win ||align=left| Duangsompong Por.Pongsawang || Lumpinee Stadium || Bangkok, Thailand || Decision  || 5 || 3:00

|- style="background:#c5d2ea;"
| 1990-03-06 || Draw||align=left| Nungubon Sitlerchai || Lumpinee Stadium ||  Bangkok, Thailand  || Decision ||5 ||3:00 

|-  style="background:#cfc;"
| 1990-01-25 || Win ||align=left| Tukkatatong Por.Pongsawang || Lumpinee Stadium || Bangkok, Thailand || Decision  || 5 || 3:00
|-  style="background:#;"
| 1989-10-20 || ||align=left| Thanooin Chorachan || Lumpinee Stadium || Bangkok, Thailand || ||  ||
|-  style="background:#cfc;"
| 1989-07-22 || Win ||align=left| Singtongnoi Sor.Siamchai || Lumpinee Stadium || Bangkok, Thailand || Decision  || 5 || 3:00
|-  style="background:#cfc;"
| 1989-06-13 || Win ||align=left| Nungubon Sitlerchai || Lumpinee Stadium || Bangkok, Thailand || Decision || 5 || 3:00
|-  style="background:#cfc;"
| 1989-05-05 || Win ||align=left| Songchainoi Por.SomchitAir || Lumpinee Stadium || Bangkok, Thailand || TKO || 3 ||
|-  style="background:#cfc;"
| 1989-04-18 || Win ||align=left| Methanoi Sor.Maliwan || Lumpinee Stadium || Bangkok, Thailand || Decision || 5 || 3:00
|-  style="background:#fbb;"
| 1989-03-18 || Loss ||align=left| Kwanla Sitbangprachan || Lumpinee Stadium || Bangkok, Thailand || KO (Left hook)|| 5 ||
|-  style="background:#cfc;"
| 1989-03-04 || Win ||align=left| Saenchai Phetbangko || Lumpinee Stadium || Bangkok, Thailand || Decision || 5 || 3:00
|-  style="background:#cfc;"
| 1989-02-17 || Win ||align=left| Audnoi Sor.Manachai || Lumpinee Stadium || Bangkok, Thailand || Decision || 5 || 3:00
|-  style="background:#fbb;"
| 1988-12-16 || Loss||align=left| Orono Por Muang Ubon || Lumpinee Stadium || Bangkok, Thailand || Decision  || 5 || 3:00
|-
| colspan=9 | Legend:

References

1971 births
Living people
Jaroensap Kiatbanchong
Jaroensap Kiatbanchong